Gushchin, Guschin or Hushchyn is a Russian surname that may refer to
Aleksandr Gushchin (footballer) (born 1966), Russian football player and coach
Aleksei Guschin (born 1971), Russian football defender
Aleksey Gushchin (1922–1986), Soviet sports shooter
Eduard Gushchin (1940–2011), Soviet shot putter
Oleksandr Hushchyn (born 1966), Ukrainian football player
Vadim Gushchin (born 1963), Russian photographer

Russian-language surnames